This is a list of gardens and botanic gardens in Scotland.

Aberdeen

Cruickshank Botanic Garden
Duthie Park winter gardens

Angus

Edzell Castle
Pitmuies

Argyll and Bute

Achamore Gardens on Gigha
An Cala on Seil
Ardkinglas Estate, Cairndow
Ardnaiseig
Arduaine
Bargullan
Colonsay House gardens
Crarae, run by the National Trust for Scotland (NTS)
Eckford Gardens
Geilston Garden (formerly in Dunbartonshire)
Strachur
Torosay Castle and garden
Younger Botanic Garden Benmore, a Regional Garden of the RBGE (see the entry for Edinburgh)

Dumfries and Galloway

Glenwhan Gardens
Logan Botanic Garden, a Regional Garden of the RBGE
Threave Gardens, (NTS)

Dundee

Dundee Botanic Garden

East Lothian

Inveresk Lodge Garden, (NTS)

East Renfrewshire

Greenbank Garden

Edinburgh

Princes Street Gardens
Royal Botanic Garden Edinburgh (RBGE) at Inverleith
Hermiston Suntrap

Fife

St Andrews Botanic Garden
Kellie Castle

Glasgow

Glasgow Botanic Gardens

Highland

Abriachan Nurseries
Ardtornish, Morvern
Armadale Castle
Balmacara Woodland Gardens, (NTS)
Cawdor Castle and Gardens, Nairn
Dunrobin Castle, Sutherland
Dunvegan Castle, Skye
Inverewe Garden, Poolewe, (NTS)
Làrach Mòr, Arisaig
Castle of Mey, Caithness

Orkney

 Happy Valley (garden)

Perth and Kinross

Branklyn Garden, (NTS)
Cluny House Gardens
Drummond Castle Garden

Scottish Borders

Dawyck Botanic Garden, a Regional Garden of the RBGE
Harmony Garden, Melrose, (NTS)
Kailzie Gardens
Manderston
Priorwood Garden, (NTS)

South Lanarkshire

 Little Sparta, Dunsyre, Lanark

See also
 List of botanical gardens in the United Kingdom
Gardens in England
Gardens in Wales
Gardens in Northern Ireland

 
Gardens